Sipyloidea sipylus, the pink winged stick insect or Madagascan stick insect, is a species of phasmid or stick insect of the genus Sipyloidea. It is the most widespread phasmid in the world, can be found  throughout tropical Asia and parts of Southeast Asia.

References

Phasmatodea
Insects of Asia
Insects described in 1859